Prophantis adusta is a moth in the family Crambidae. It was described by Inoue in 1986. It is found in India, China, Japan, Taiwan, Papua New Guinea and Australia, where it has been recorded from Queensland.

References

Spilomelinae
Moths described in 1986